Miss Auvergne is a French beauty pageant which selects a representative for the Miss France national competition from the region of Auvergne. The first Miss Auvergne was crowned in 1968, although the pageant was not held regularly until 1990.

The current Miss Auvergne is Alissia Ladevèze, who was crowned Miss Auvergne 2022 on 17 September 2022. No Miss Auvergne titleholders have gone on to win Miss France.

Results summary
2nd Runner-Up: Maryline Brun (1999; Miss Pays du Velay); Clémence Oleksy (2010)
3rd Runner-Up: Michèle Cointet (1974)
4th Runner-Up: Alissia Ladevèze (2022)
5th Runner-Up: Camille Blond (2013)
Top 12/Top 15: Régine Bac (1990); Fabienne Chol (1993; Miss Pays du Velay); Catherine Sarret (1996); Fabienne Malisano (1997); Pauline Abeillon (2003; Miss Pays du Velay); Emmanuelle Lemery (2007)

Titleholders

Miss Pays du Velay
From 1993 to 2004, the department of Haute-Loire competed separately as Miss Pays du Velay.

Notes

References

External links

Miss France regional pageants
Beauty pageants in France
Women in France